Cleghorn railway station served the village of Cleghorn, South Lanarkshire, Scotland from 1848 to 1965 on the Caledonian main line.

History 
The station opened as Lanark on 15 February 1848 by the Caledonian Railway, although it was used earlier on 31 January 1848 by Mr Scott for a special service to Beattock. Its name was changed to Cleghorn Junction on 1 January 1855 when the Lanark branch opened. To the northeast was the goods yard and to the southeast was the signal box. The station's name changed again to Cleghorn on 1 April 1864. The station, along with the signal box, closed on 4 January 1965.

References

External links 

Disused railway stations in South Lanarkshire
Former Caledonian Railway stations
Railway stations in Great Britain opened in 1848
Railway stations in Great Britain closed in 1965
1848 establishments in Scotland
1965 disestablishments in Scotland
Beeching closures in Scotland